Parchestan-e Ali Hoseyn Molla (also Romanized as Parchestān-e ʿAlī Ḩoseyn Mollā; also known as Parchestān-e Alīhoseynmowlā) is a village in Howmeh-ye Sharqi Rural District, in the Central District of Izeh County, Khuzestan Province, Iran. At the 2006 census, its population was 459, in 84 families.

References 

Populated places in Izeh County